Jesus Baltazar Lava (May 15, 1914 – January 21, 2003) was the Secretary General of the first Communist Party of the Philippines (PKP) from 1950.

Jesus Lava became the Secretary General of the pro-Soviet PKP after the arrest of his brother José Lava. In 1968, part of the membership of the party split to create a new Maoist Communist Party of the Philippines (CPP). Lava, the General Secretary of the already disappearing PKP, was labelled a "counterrevolutionary revisionist".

Family
Jesus Lava was the youngest of nine children of Adeodato Lava and Maria Baltazar. The Lavas were a prominent family in Bulacan in the Philippines.

Notes

References

External links
Photo of Jose Lava

1914 births
2003 deaths
Filipino communists
Filipino revolutionaries
Communist Party of the Philippines politicians
University of the Philippines alumni